Ridge Racer, released in Japan as , is an arcade racing video game developed by Namco for the PlayStation Portable. It is named after the eponymous Ridge Racer video game series to which it belongs. The game was released in Japan on 12 December 2004, in North America on 24 March 2005, and in Europe and Australia on 1 September as a launch title. Available in the game is a fully playable version of the Namco arcade game New Rally-X.

Ridge Racer has been described as a 'compilation' of the series, featuring tracks, cars and remixed soundtrack from previous titles in the 1990s. Ridge Racer was very well received by critics and was praised for its visuals, gameplay and soundtrack. It was re-released in 2005/2006 as a platinum title. A sequel titled Ridge Racer 2 has also been released for the PSP.

Gameplay
The core aspect of the entire Ridge Racer series is drift racing, that is traditional lap racing against opponents with the added twist of intentionally oversteering and sliding the car through sharp corners and turns, known as "drifting", which earns the player several bonuses during a race.

Game modes are World Tour, Single race, Time Trial, and Wireless Battle, which supports up to 8 player multiplayer over the PSP's ad hoc, Wi-Fi network capability (see PSP Wireless Networking for further information).

The game also features a full motion video opening, that shows series mascot Reiko Nagase.

Nitrous
Notable in the game is the "nitrous boost" system. The player has a Nitrous Gauge made up of three nitrous tanks, which at the start of a race are either completely depleted or only partially full. As the player drifts through the corners (especially at very high slip angles) during the race, their nitrous gauge fills up. When the player fills up one of the three nitrous tanks, it can be activated to achieve a temporary speed boost. The nitrous tanks cannot be recharged while any tank is in use though, but the residual speed increase when the nitrous boost expires can be used just before entering corners to recharge the player's nitrous tanks at a faster rate than normal.

Music
The music in the game is a collection of new songs and songs taken from previous Ridge Racer games, arranged across several "discs". The "Red" and "Blue" discs contain all-new songs put together specifically for the game while the two "Classic" discs contains a collection of remastered songs from Ridge Racer titles. Lastly, the "Remix" disc contains songs from past titles remixed by their original composers.

Red Disc
 Highride
 Warp Trooper
 Bassrider
 Pulse Phaze
 Chrome Drive
 Synthetic Life

Blue Disc
 Disco Ball
 Night Stream
 Light Groove
 Vanishing Horizon
 Tunnel Visionary
 Tek Trek

Remix Disc
 Rotterdam Nation Remix - from the PlayStation titles, Ridge Racer and Ridge Racer Revolution.
 Speedster Remix - from the PlayStation titles, Ridge Racer and Ridge Racer Revolution.
 Drive U 2 Dancing Remix - from the arcade title Ridge Racer 2 and the PlayStation title, Ridge Racer Revolution.
 Rareheroes - featured in many past Ridge Racer titles.
 Blue Topaz Remix - from the arcade title, Rave Racer.
 Motor Species Remix - from the PlayStation title, Ridge Racer Type 4.

Classic Disc 1
 Ridge Racer - A remastered version of the title tune from the PlayStation title, Ridge Racer.
 Grip - from the arcade title, Ridge Racer 2, and the PlayStation title, Ridge Racer Revolution.
 Euphoria - from the arcade title, Rave Racer.
 Silver Stream - from the PlayStation title, Rage Racer.
 Naked Glow - from the PlayStation title, Ridge Racer Type 4
 Your Vibe - from the PlayStation title, Ridge Racer Type 4.

Classic Disc 2
 Move Me - from the PlayStation title, Ridge Racer Type 4.
 Movin' in Circles - from the PlayStation title, Ridge Racer Type 4.
 Eat 'Em Up! - from the PlayStation title, Ridge Racer Type 4 (this was a secret track acquired along with the Pac-Man car after unlocking all 320 of the cars featured in the game).
 TsuiTsui - from the PlayStation 2 title, Ridge Racer V.
 Samurai Rocket - from the PlayStation 2 title, Ridge Racer V.
 Daredevil - from the PlayStation 2 title, Ridge Racer V.

Reception

Ridge Racer received "generally favorable reviews" according to the review aggregation website Metacritic. Its graphical ability and visuals were incredible on a portable device in 2004, and it was further praised for its gameplay, soundtrack (which also consisted of remixed tracks from older Ridge Racer titles) and multiplayer option. PALGN praised the game's graphics and the gameplay and considered the best Ridge Racer title for PSP. GameBiz also held similar sentiment of the game. In Japan, Famitsu gave it a score of two eights and two nines for a total of 34 out of 40.

References

External links

2004 video games
Multiplayer and single-player video games
Multiplayer online games
Namco games
PlayStation Portable games
PlayStation Portable-only games
Racing video games
Ridge Racer
Sony Interactive Entertainment games
Video games developed in Japan
Video games scored by Yuu Miyake